Paciocinebrina grippi is a species of sea snail, a marine gastropod mollusk in the family Muricidae, the murex snails or rock snails.

Description

Distribution
This marine species occurs off San Diego, California.

References

External links
 Dall, W. H. (1911). A new California Eupleura. The Nautilus. 25(8): 87
 Houart, R.; Vermeij, G.; Wiedrick, S. (2019). New taxa and new synonymy in Muricidae (Neogastropoda: Pagodulinae, Trophoninae, Ocenebrinae) from the Northeast Pacific. Zoosymposia. 13(1): 184–241

Muricidae
Gastropods described in 1911